Richard Mowatt, commonly known by his stage name Solarstone (formerly spelled Solar Stone), is an Irish trance DJ and producer based in Wales. The music project Solarstone was founded as a trio, and also used the pseudonyms Young Parisians, Liquid State and Z2. Over the years, Solarstone has developed a reputation for keeping to the original and classic trance sound. He is considered to be a veteran by fans in the trance music scene. Since 2012, Solarstone has been pushing forward a Pure Trance movement through tours where he aims to keep the trance genre true to its roots.

Biography 
The music project Solar Stone was founded in Dudley in 1997 by Richard Mowatt, Andy Bury and Sam Tierney. Since 1994 the trio had been known as the Space Kittens. Sam Tierney left the group in 1997 owing to musical differences, and in 2006 Andy Bury also left, leaving Mowatt as the sole member.

Solarstone has had three major hit singles in the UK. The most successful was Seven Cities, which reached number 39 in 1999. The song was one of the earliest and most famous examples of the Balearic trance genre, and has been re-released three times. The song has sold over 500,000 copies.

In 2003 and 2004 Solarstone collaborated with Scott Bond, releasing the three singles "3rd Earth", "Naked Angel" and "Red Line Highway". The group's debut album, AnthologyOne, was released in 2006. In 2008, the second studio album, Rain Stars Eternal, was released.

Solarstone has also produced several remixes and collaborated with renowned trance artists such as Paul Oakenfold.

In 2014, Solarstone and Giuseppe Ottaviani began a collaboration project known as PureNRG. PureNRG have since released a number of singles, and perform live on stage regularly.

Radio shows 
The Deep Blue Radioshow was produced by Rich Mowatt, the first episode of which was released on 19 May 2005. The first show featured a 30minute Woody van Eyden Guestmix and was nearly 2hrs long. The final episode of Deep Blue Radio Show was 116 DJd by Robbie Nelson and was released on 10 July 2008.

Rich Mowatt and Robbie Nelson later produced the Solaris International Radio Show, beginning in 2004, which was distributed through various online channels. In the early years, the programme appeared irregularly and was a mix of interviews and new music. From December 2006 (Episode 33) it appeared as a weekly, two-hour podcast. The show was reduced to a 1hr show in episode 294. Solaris International was hosted on alternate weeks by Nelson and Mowatt and included new tracks and remixes, a half-hour guest DJ mix, and at least one classic trance track from the late 1990s or early 2000s. The final episode was number 465 which was released on 18 August 2015.

On 2 September 2015, Solarstone launched the first episode of his new radio show Pure Trance Radio. Episode 100 was broadcast on 9 August 2017, live from the A State of Trance Studio in Amsterdam. The show is released on various platforms. All episodes of the show are presented by Solarstone.

Solarstone launched The Morning Show on 2 November 2020, streamed live on weekdays at his Twitch channel, features include the Coffee Break and the subscriber-requested Kickstarter.

Discography 

Studio albums

Compilation albums

 Singles

Remixes

 1997: Energy 52 – Café Del Mar
 1997: Chakra – Home
 1998: Dominion – 11 hours
 1999: Matt Darey – From Russia With Love
 2000: Moonman – Galaxia
 2000: Planet Perfecto – Bullet in the Gun 2000
 2000: Cygnus X – Orange Theme
 2001: Junk Project – Composure
 2001: Jan Johnston – Silent Words
 2002: Paul Oakenfold – Southern Sun
 2002: Conjure One - Sleep
 2003: Conjure One - Center of the Sun
 2004: Filo and Peri presents Whirlpool – Under the Sun
 2004: Sarah McLachlan – World on Fire
 2008: Radiohead – House of Cards
 2009: Ferry Corsten – Gabriellas Sky
 2012: Delerium featuring Michael Logen - Days Turn Into Nights
 2013: Armin Van Buuren featuring Emma Hewitt - Forever Is Ours
2013: Vangelis - Love Theme from Blade Runner
 2015: Gai Barone - Mr. Slade
 2016: Markus Schulz - Facedown
 2016: Gai Barone - Lost in Music
 2017: Raz Nitzan and Moya Brennan - Find The Sun (Solarstone Remix)
 2017: Eco - The Lonely Soldier (Solarstone Pure Remix)
 2017: Future Disciple - Jinka Blue (Solarstone Pure Remix)
 2018: Pink Bomb - Indica (Solarstone Pure Mix)
 2019: Duncan Laurence - Arcade
 2020: Markus Schulz and Adina Butar - In Search of Sunrise (Solarstone Pure Mix)
 2020: Hybrid – Nails
 2022: Sunscreem – Love U More

References

1997 establishments in England
British trance music groups
Irish DJs
Musical groups established in 1997
Musical groups from Birmingham, West Midlands